Ceratophyllus coahuilensis is a species of flea in the family Ceratophyllidae. It was described by Eads in 1956.

References 

Ceratophyllidae
Insects described in 1956
Insects of North America